In 1863, amid the American Civil War (in which the state of Virginia was disputed between the United States and the breakaway Confederate States of America), two gubernatorial elections were held as a result of this dispute, a Confederate election and a Union election.

Confederate election

The 1863 Virginia Confederate gubernatorial election was held on May 28, 1863, to elect the Confederate governor of Virginia. At the time, the governorship of the state was disputed as a result of the American Civil War.

Union election

The 1863 Virginia Union gubernatorial election was held on December 2, 1863, to elect the Union governor of Virginia. At the time, the governorship of the state was disputed as a result of the American Civil War, and disputed incumbent Republican/Unionist Francis Harrison Pierpont ran unopposed.

References

1863
Virginia
gubernatorial
December 1863 events
May 1863 events